Papilio ulysses, the Ulysses butterfly (also commonly known as the Blue emperor), is a large swallowtail butterfly of Australia, Indonesia, Papua New Guinea and the Solomon Islands.

This butterfly is used as an emblem for tourism in Queensland, Australia.

Description

The upperside of the wings are an iridescent electric blue; the underside is a more subdued black and brown. The colours are produced by the microscopic structure of the scales, a phenomenon called structural colouration.

The female of the species is different from the male in that she has little crescents of blue in the back, upside sections of her hindwings, where there is only black for males. When the butterfly is perched the intense blue of its wings is hidden by the plainer brown under side of its wings, helping it to blend in with its surroundings. When in flight, the butterfly can be seen hundreds of metres away as sudden bright blue flashes. Males are strongly attracted to the colour blue, including blue objects which are sometimes mistaken for females.

Similar species
The other members of the  Papilio ulysses  species group.
Papilio montrouzieri Boisduval, 1859
Papilio syfanius  Oberthür, 1886

Subspecies
P. u. ulysses  Seran, Ambon
P. u. telemachus Montrouzier, 1856 Trobriand, Fergusson, Goodenough
P. u. telegonus  C. & R. Felder, 1860 Bachan, Ternate, Halmahera
P. u. autolycus  C. & R. Felder, 1865 West Irian - Papua
P. u. joesa Butler, 1869 Cape York - McKay, Queensland
P. u. orsippus Godman & Salvin, 1888 Choiseul, Isabel, Guadalcana, Florida Island
P. u. ambiguus  Rothschild, 1895 Bismarck Archipelago
P. u. melanotica  Hagen, 1897 Moluccas
P. u. gabrielis  Rothschild, 1898 Admiralty Is.
P. u. nigerrimus  Ribbe, 1898 Bougainville, Shortland Is.
P. u. morotaicus  Rothschild, 1908 Morotai Island
P. u. dohertius  Rothschild, 1898 Obi
P. u. ampelius  Rothschild, 1908 Buru
P. u. oxyartes  Fruhstorfer, 1909 Aru
P. u. georgius  Rothschild, 1908 New Georgia Group

Diet and conservation

Conservation
The Ulysses butterfly inhabits tropical rainforest areas and suburban gardens. The Australian government requires breeders to obtain permits, although the species is not endangered. In the past, this butterfly had been threatened but planting pink flowered doughwood has increased its numbers. Reduction in the number of the Euodia trees, a tree heavily used for laying eggs and for leaves eaten by caterpillars, may threaten the survival of this butterfly. Females favour small trees up to 2 metres tall to lay their eggs.

Diet
The larval food plants of this butterfly include kerosene wood, a variety of Citrus, and Euodia. In Australia, the Ulysses butterfly imago is known to feed from the blossoms of the pink flowered doughwood, a tree with clusters of small pink flowers that extrude from its branches.

References

Further reading
Erich Bauer and Thomas Frankenbach, 1998 Schmetterlinge der Erde, Butterflies of the World Part I (1), Papilionidae Papilionidae I: Papilio, Subgenus Achillides, Bhutanitis, Pooples. Edited by  Erich Bauer and Thomas Frankenbach.  Keltern: Goecke & Evers; Canterbury: Hillside Books,

External links

ButterflyCorner.net
Papilio
ABC Contribute

ulysses
Butterflies described in 1758
Butterflies of Asia
Butterflies of Australia
Taxa named by Carl Linnaeus